ECUARUNARI (in Kichwa: , "Movement of the indigenous people of Ecuador"), also known as Confederation of Peoples of Kichwa Nationality (in Spanish ) is the organization of indigenous peoples of Kichwa nationality in the Ecuadorian central mountain region, founded in 1972.

Twelve ethnic groups of the region—Natabuela, Otavalos, Karanki (Caranqui), Kayampi (Cayambi), Kitu Kara (Quitu), Panzaleo, Salasaca, Chibuleo, Puruhá, Guranga, Kañari and Saraguros—are represented politically by the Confederation. ECUARUNARI is one of three major regional groupings that constitute the Confederation of Indigenous Nationalities of Ecuador (CONAIE). It is also member of the Andean indigenous organization, Coordination of Indigenous Organizations of the Andes (Coordinadora Andina de Organizaciones Indígenas, CAOI).

The current president of ECUARUNARI since 2019 is Blanca Chancoso from Kichwa-otavalo.

External links
 ecuarunari.org.ec - Official website
 Llacta! - sobre ECUARUNARI
 Revista Rikcharishun

Indigenous organisations in Ecuador
1972 establishments in Ecuador